is a global non-government organization headquartered in Japan established for the purpose of raising awareness and building connections internationally among groups that work for peace, human rights, environmental protection and sustainable development. "Peace Boat" may also refer to one of the ships embarking on a cruise under the Peace Boat organization. Since its founding in 1983, the Shinjuku, Tokyo based organization has launched more than 100 voyages. These cruises, the main operation of the Peace Boat organization, are on average carried out at least three times a year. Peace Boat, described by the San Francisco Chronicle as a "floating university of sorts", offers educational opportunities aboard, with conferences related to global events. They also provide humanitarian aid at their various stops and visit local organizations.

Besides the international voyages, Peace Boat carries out a number of other projects seeking justice in various international realms such as a campaign for the abolition of land mines, the Global Article 9 Conference to Abolish War or Global Hibakusha Forums onboard and in ports. Peace Boat also acts as the Northeast Asia regional secretariat of the Global Partnership for the Prevention of Armed Conflict
and is member of ICAN (International Campaign to Abolish Nuclear Weapons), having played a significant role in negotiations to strengthen the Treaty on the Prohibition of Nuclear Weapons, which was awarded the Nobel Peace Prize on December 10, 2017.
Peace Boat is an NGO in Special Consultative Status with the Economic and Social Council of the United Nations and a committed campaigner for the Sustainable Development Goals (SDGs).

History

Founding 
In 1983, Yoshioka Tatsuya and Kiyomi Tsujimoto, then students of Waseda University, initiated Peace Boat in answer to Japanese history textbook controversies. With the assistance of like-minded students, they organized the first voyage. Peace Boat has since visited more than 270 ports with over 70,000 participants.

Past Peace Boat cruises

Short cruises in Asia 
During the first six years after it was founded, Peace Boat ran one- to two-week long cruises to various Asian countries around Japan at the rate of one per year. Time on the boat was used to hold lectures and events with guest speakers invited from the countries to be visited. When at port, international exchange events were carried out with local NGOs and student groups. This became the foundational style for which the rest of the cruises would be based on.

Start of circumnavigational cruises 
In 1990, the 10th Peace Boat cruise marked the beginning of the circumnavigational cruise series. During the cruise, the Gulf War broke out and the ship encountered a US aircraft carrier in the Red Sea. After the success of first round-the-world cruise, Peace Boat continued them on a regular basis.

'Citizen's Diplomacy' trip to Kuril Islands 
In 1991, after the fall of the Soviet Union, set out to the Kuril Islands with the notion of a 'Citizen's Diplomacy' mission, stopping at Iturup, Kunashir, and Shikotan islands. There were homestays and tours. This was the first trip made to these islands without a visa by an NGO from Japan.

More cruises 
Over the past 30 years, Peace Boat has organized over 100 voyages, including more than 60 around-the-world voyages, carrying over 70,000 participants to over 270 ports. The participants range from toddlers to people in their 90s, from many different countries and professions. The organization was nominated for the Nobel Prize in 2008.

Ships 

During its history, Peace Boat has always chartered different vessels. These are the most recent:

The Topaz (31,500 GT) – It was a transatlantic ocean liner built in 1955 as Empress of Britain. Operated as Peace Boat between 2000 and 2008.
Clipper Pacific (18,416 GT) – Built in 1970 for Royal Caribbean. Operated for Peace Boat briefly in 2008. However, due to numerous repeated problems with the ship, the charter was cut short, ending in Piraeus, Greece instead of ending in Japan as scheduled.
Mona Lisa (28,891 GRT) – Built in 1966 by a shipyard in Scotland. Chartered to replace the Clipper Pacific and completed the remainder of the voyage. Operated as Peace Boat between 2008 and 2009.
 Olvia
Oceanic (38,772 GT) – Built in 1965 by an Italian shipyard. Operated as Peace Boat between 2009 and 2012.
Ocean Dream (32,265 GT) – Built in 1981 by a Danish shipyard. Operated as Peace Boat between 2012 and 2020.
The Zenith (47,413 GT) – In July 2019 it was announced the Zenith would leave Pullmantur's fleet in early 2020 to Peace Boat. The ship was delivered to Peace Boat in February 2020 and renamed The Zenith.

Since 2020, Peace Boat is operating the Pacific World, which replaces the Ocean Dream and The Zenith.

Other projects

Landmine Abolition Campaign 
Since 1998, Peace Boat has continually run a project called P-MAC, or Peace Boat Mine Abolition Campaign, to support organizations carrying out landmine removal in such countries as Cambodia and Afghanistan. In the world there are approximately 110 million landmines in the ground, and even now many continue to be injured or lose their life without a trace. Most of these victims are not combatants but normal civilians. As of 2009, through a number of campaigns, Peace Boat raised money to clear 886,472 sq meters of landmine inundated areas and open five elementary schools. Fund raising campaigns are ongoing.

Peace Ball Project 
Since 1999, Peace Boat has donated over 12,000 soccer balls to 43 countries. The Peace Ball project delivers soccer balls and other sports equipment to disadvantaged children, and uses the power of the world's most popular sport to build bridges of communication and solidarity.

GET Language Programme 
Launched in 1999, the onboard GET language programme allows participants to communicate more effectively with the people they meet onboard and in port. The programme focuses on oral communication, viewing languages as global tools for international and intercultural exchange, and combines onboard classroom study with exchange programmes and home-stays in selected ports of call.

Global University Programme 
In 2000, Peace Boat established its Global University peace education programme. Seminars at sea and study/exposure tours at ports of call make up the Global University curriculum, an intensive peace and sustainability education programme focused on experiential learning.

Global Partnership for the Prevention of Armed Conflict (GPPAC) 
In 2004, Peace Boat became the Northeast Asia regional secretariat for the Global Partnership for the Prevention of Armed Conflict (GPPAC). This is an international network of NGOs working in peacebuilding and conflict prevention. It is made up of 15 regions, each working with its own action plan to address issues specific to each region.

Global Article 9 Campaign 
In light of the Japanese government's pressure to amend it, Peace Boat together with the Japan Lawyers' International Solidarity Association (JALISA), launched the Global Article 9 Campaign to Abolish War in 2005. The Campaign strives not only to protect Article 9 locally, but also to build an international movement supporting Article 9 as the shared property of the world, calling for a global peace that does not rely on force.

Vietnam Defoliate Victim Support Campaign 
From 2005 to 2008 Peace Boat raised approximately $13,000 in funds which were donated to Vietnam Association of Victims of Agent Orange and subsequently used to cover a portion of construction costs for a facility for supporting victims. On the 2009 cruise, Peace Boat visited the facility with a group of Japanese atomic bomb victims, and held the first exchange program there.

International Campaign to Abolish Nuclear Weapons (ICAN) 
The International Campaign to Abolish Nuclear Weapons (ICAN) is a coalition of NGOs in 100 countries around the world. Peace Boat is a member of the campaign's international steering group, led by Executive Committee Member Kawasaki Akira. ICAN played a significant role in advocacy leading to the adoption of a treaty to prohibit nuclear weapons at the United Nations in New York in July 2017. In October 2017, the Norwegian Nobel Committee decided to award the Nobel Peace Prize for 2017 to ICAN. The organization received the award for its work to draw attention to the catastrophic humanitarian consequences of any use of nuclear weapons and for its ground-breaking efforts to achieve a treaty-based prohibition of such weapons.

The Hibakusha Project 
The Hibakusha Project was started by Peace Boat to highlight the inhumanity of nuclear weapons and to forge a path toward a nuclear abolition. As part of the project, Hibakusha (atomic bomb survivors from Hiroshima and Nagasaki) join Peace Boat voyages to give their testimonies to the world of their first hand experiences with nuclear weapons, and call for their abolition. In 2016, the project has taken place on ninth separate Peace Boat voyages and more than 170 Hibakusha have travelled around the world sharing their testimonies.

Peace Boat Millennium Development Goals Campaign 
Since 2009, Peace Boat run its own Millennium Development Goals Campaign in partnership with various international organizations and NGOs to raise awareness of the MDGs and the role of civil society in achieving these goals. Peace Boat's ship displayed the United Nations Millennium Campaign logo ‘End Poverty 2015’.

Peace Boat Disaster Relief Volunteer Centre 
The Peace Boat Disaster Relief Volunteer Center was established following the tremendous devastation caused by the 2011 Great East Japan earthquake and tsunami. The Center based its activities in one of the worst affected areas, Ishinomaki City in Miyagi Prefecture, and dispatched thousands of volunteers there to support local residents in carrying out emergency relief efforts. PBV carries out domestic and international emergency relief work at sites affected by natural disasters such as typhoons, floods and heavy snow. At the same time, it works toward future disaster prevention and reduction by proactively building partnerships with business and local government authorities and cultivating a network of volunteer leaders ready to act.

Ecoship 
Peace Boat's Ecoship is a transformational programme to construct the planet's most environmentally sustainable cruise ship. Peace Boat organised a multi-disciplinary charrette, bringing together world experts from fields as diverse as naval architecture, renewable energy, and biophilic and biomimetic design with the goal of defining the specifications for a ‘restorative’ vessel – where radical energy efficiency and closed material flow combine for a net positive impact on the environment. It will be a flagship for climate action. Its whole-system design and maximization of renewable energy use will enable 40%  cuts. Ecoship was introduced in an official press conference at COP21.

The Ocean and Climate Youth Ambassador Programme 
A group of young leaders from states on the front line of climate change and marine degradation joined Peace Boat's 95th Global Voyage in Barcelona on September and October 2017 as a part of a new programme to highlight these crucial issues and build momentum for climate action and the Bonn 2017 UN Climate Change Conference (COP23). These young women and men between 19 and 26 years of age were from the regions of the Pacific Ocean, Indian Ocean and Caribbean. The Ocean and Climate Youth Ambassador Programme was an endorsed event of the COP23 in line with Fiji's vision for the COP23, as recognized by the COP23 Presidency Secretariat. In June and July 2018, the second edition of the programme took place from Stockholm to New York City. The third edition took place on May and June 2019 from Valletta to New York City.

References

External links 
Official site

Environmental organizations based in Japan
Climate change organizations
International environmental organizations
Anti-nuclear organizations
Nature conservation organisations based in Asia
International organizations based in Japan
1983 establishments in Japan
International Campaign to Abolish Nuclear Weapons